Adelopoma stolli is a species of land snail with an operculum, a terrestrial gastropod mollusk in the family Cyclophoridae.

This species is found in Guatemala and Nicaragua.

References

Cyclophoridae
Gastropods described in 1890
Taxonomy articles created by Polbot